The Queen's Head is a pub at 144 Stockwell Road, Stockwell, London SW9.

It is a Grade II listed building, "of Regency appearance with alterations".

References

External links
 

Grade II listed pubs in London
Grade II listed buildings in the London Borough of Lambeth
Pubs in the London Borough of Lambeth